Lu Huali (路华利) is a Chinese rower. She won a bronze medal in Double sculls with her partner Gu Xiaoli at the 1992 Barcelona Olympic Games.

References

Chinese female rowers
Olympic rowers of China
Rowers at the 1992 Summer Olympics
Olympic bronze medalists for China
Living people
1972 births
Olympic medalists in rowing
Medalists at the 1992 Summer Olympics
20th-century Chinese women
21st-century Chinese women